Evidence of Things Unseen may refer to:

 "Evidence of Things Unseen" (CSI: Miami)
 Evidence of Things Unseen (album), an album by American jazz pianist Don Pullen
 "...Evidence of Things Unseen", a song by Your Memorial from the album Redirect